The École nationale supérieure d'architecture et de paysage de Bordeaux (ENSAPBx) is a French school which provides training leading to the national diploma of architect, as well as the State diploma of landscape gardener (DEP). The school is located in Talence.

References

External links
 

Bordeaux